Rustai-ye Shahid Saidi (also Romanized as Rūstāī-ye Shahīd Sa‘īdī; also known as Shahīd Sa‘īdī) is a village in Maskun Rural District, Jebalbarez District, Jiroft County, Kerman Province, Iran. At the 2006 census, its population was 287, in 62 families.

References 

Populated places in Jiroft County